Pyuntaza (also spelt Pyuntasa) is a small town located in Nyaunglebin Township, Bago District, Bago Region, Myanmar.

The dominant ethnic group is Bamar, although there is a substantial number of Karen. The town's main economy consists of rice cultivation and distribution.

Etymology
The name Pyuntaza comes from the Mon language term plaem sotchaek, which means "to break vows."

History

The township's population in 1901 was 52,952 persons, having more than doubled since 1891 (23,132). The western flank of the former Pyuntaza Township is hilly, while the eastern half is a flat rice-producing area.

During World War II, prominent Burmese barrister U Chan Htoon retreated to Pyuntaza as his place of retirement.

References

Populated places in Bago Region